Ayla Kalkandelen (14 March 1939 – 28 April 2002) was a Turkish entomologist. Her specialty was in Auchenorrhyncha, a suborder of true bugs or insects order Homoptera. She described ten taxa and has five taxa named after her.

Ayla Kalkandelen was born in Gaziantep on 14 March 1939. She had an elder brother named Nejat. She completed her primary and secondary education in her hometown.

She graduated from the Department of Vineyard and horticulture production and rehabilitation in the Faculty of Agriculture at Ankara University in 1962. The same year, she was employed by the Research Institute for  	Agricultural Pest Control in Ankara.

After attending a course at the Georgetown Language School, Washington D.C. in 1964, she studied at Clemson University, South Carolina on an American scholarship between 1965 and 1966, graduating with a Master's degree.

During her stay in the United States, she was instructed in the taxonomy of Cicadellidae (leafhopper), a suborder of Homoptera, at Ohio State University in 1966 and National Museum of Natural History, Washington D.C. in 1967.

In November 1971, she received a PhD degree from the Department of Plant Protection at Ankara University for her thesis on Orta Anadolu'da Homoptera: Cicadellidae Familyası Türlerinin Taksonomisi Üzerine Araştırmalar ("Research on the Taxonomy of the Homoptera part  Cicadellidae Family in Central Anatolia"). She was appointed associate professor at her alma mater in October 1995.

Between 1986 and 1990, Kalkandelen was editor-in-chief of the Turkish "Plant Protection Bulletin". Four taxa were named after her by the Czech taxonomist J. Diabola and one by German H. Hoch. The "Union of Chambers of Turkish Engineers and Architects" bestowed her one of its Service Award of 2002.

Kalkandelen retired in 1997. She died on 28 April 2002.

Taxa defined by Kalkandelen
Cicadellidae (Homoptera)
Diplocolenus (Verdanus) bekiri Kalkandelen, 1972
Mocuellus dlabolai Kalkandelen, 1972
Mocuellus foxi Kalkandelen, 1972
Mocuellus zelihae Kalkandelen, 1972
Paluda vitripennis lalahani Kalkandelen, 1972
Zyginidia (Zyginidia) artvinicus Kalkandelen, 1985
Zyginidia (Zyginidia) karadenizicus Kalkandelen, 1985
Zyginidia (Zyginidia) bafranicus Kalkandelen, 1985
Zyginidia (Zyginidia) emrea Kalkandelen, 1985
Delphacidae (Homoptera)
Eurybregma dlabolai Kalkandelen, 1980

Taxa named after Kalkandelen
Cicadellidae (Homoptera)
Anoplotettix kalkandeleni Dlabola, 1971
Issidae (Homoptera)
Tshurtshurnella kalkandelenica Dlabola, 1982
Quadristylum aylae Dlabola, 1985
Derbidae (Homoptera)
Malenia aylae Dlabola, 1983
Cixiidae  (Homoptera)
Hyalesthes aylanus Hoch, 1985

References

1939 births
People from Gaziantep
Ankara University alumni
Clemson University alumni
Academic staff of Ankara University
Turkish entomologists
Women entomologists
Turkish women academics
Turkish women scientists
Hemipterists
20th-century zoologists
2002 deaths
20th-century Turkish scientists